Macrochironidae is a family of copepods belonging to the order Cyclopoida.

Genera:
 Macrochiron Brady, 1872
 Oncaeola Kramer, 1895
 Paramacrochiron Sewell, 1949
 Pseudomacrochiron Reddiah, 1969
 Sewellochiron Humes, 1969

References

Copepods